Mitchell L. Scoggins (born November 6, 1955) is an American politician. He is a member of the Georgia House of Representatives from the 14th District.

References 

Living people
Republican Party members of the Georgia House of Representatives
People from Bartow County, Georgia
21st-century American politicians
1955 births